Semta was a Roman era Municipium also known as Augustum Semta in Africa Proconsularis that is tentatively identified with ruins at Henchir Zemba (Dzemda)  Carthage, Tunisia near  the Oued el Kebir  southwest of Zaghouan at 36.269282, 9.887345.

Ruins
The site has been excavated and those excavations revealed three different building complexes:
 a  rectangular building, 
Numerous inscriptions have been found there.

Bishopric
The ancient city was also the seat of an ancient bishopric in the ecclesiastical province of Carthage.
Only two bishops are known from Semta. The Catholic Maggiorino attended the Council of Carthage (411), as at that time the city had no Donatist bishops. Florenzio took part in the anti-Monothelite Council of Carthage (646). The current bishop is Juan Gómez.

References

Archaeological sites in Tunisia
Roman towns and cities in Tunisia
Catholic titular sees in Africa